Yeshiva Shaarei Torah or Yeshiva Shaarei Torah of Rockland is a mesivta (Orthodox Jewish high school) in Suffern, New York.

History 
The school was originally established in 1968 as Monsey Mesivta High School in Monsey, New York. Nine years later it was taken over by Berel Wein, when it became known as Yeshiva Shaarei Torah. Wein served as its rosh yeshiva (dean), and Emanuel Schwartz was the English studies principal, until the latter stepped down from that position in 1994, remaining at the school to focus on teaching precalculus. Wein left the school in 1997, when it was taken over by Martin Wolmark, who then became dean.

On October 10, 2013, the yeshiva was raided by the Federal Bureau of Investigation in connection with Wolmark's involvement with the New York divorce coercion gang.

Campus 
Shaarei Torah is situated on a 5-acre campus on West Carlton Road in Suffern, New York. It consists of a main educational building and a student residence hall.

See also 

 Torah study

References

External links 
 

1968 establishments in New York (state)
1968 in Judaism
Educational institutions established in 1968
Schools in Rockland County, New York
Mesivtas
Private high schools in New York (state)
Shaarei Torah, Yeshiva